Ängelholms IP, sometimes also referred to as Änglavallen, is a football and athletics stadium in Ängelholm, and the home arena for Ängelholms FF. It was inaugurated on 9 September 1925.

Ängelholms IP has a total capacity of 5,000 spectators.

Image gallery

References

Football venues in Sweden
Ängelholms FF
Sport in Ängelholm
1925 establishments in Sweden
Sports venues completed in 1925
20th-century establishments in Skåne County